The following lists events that happened during 1963 in Laos.

Incumbents
 Monarch: Savang Vatthana
 Prime Minister: Souvanna Phouma

Events

November
 November - The Battle of Lak Sao begins.

Births
 8 May - Soulivong Savang, current Lao royal pretender

Deaths
 1 April - Quinim Pholsena, Laotian foreign minister, assassinated

References

 
1960s in Laos
Years of the 20th century in Laos
Laos
Laos